The 1999 St. Petersburg Open was a tennis tournament played on indoor carpet courts at the Petersburg Sports and Concert Complex in Saint Petersburg in Russia and was part of the World Series of the 1999 ATP Tour. The tournament ran from February 8 through February 14, 1999.

Finals

Singles

 Marc Rosset defeated  David Prinosil, 6–3, 6–4.
 It was Rosset's 1st title of the year and the 13th of his career.

Doubles

 Jeff Tarango /  Daniel Vacek defeated  Menno Oosting /  Andrei Pavel, 3–6, 6–3, 7–5.
 It was Tarango's 2nd title of the year and the 8th of his career. It was Vacek's 2nd title of the year and the 22nd of his career.

References

External links
 Official website  
 Official website 
 ATP Tournament Profile

St. Petersburg Open
St. Petersburg Open
St. Petersburg Open
St. Petersburg Open